Wonderland is the debut studio album by American DJ and producer Steve Aoki. It was released on January 10, 2012 through Ultra Records and Dim Mak Records. It was nominated for a Grammy Award for Best Electronic/Dance Album in 2013. Most songs from the album were released as a single with its own remixes (exceptions being "Dangerous" and "Livin' My Love"). The remix album was released five months later on June 10, 2012.

Track listing

Chart history

See also
 Dim Mak Records
 Ultra Records

References

External links
 SteveAoki.com
 Releases | Dim Mak
 Wonderland - Steve Aoki | AllMusic
 Steve Aoki Discography at Discogs

2012 debut albums
Electronic dance music albums by American artists
Steve Aoki albums